Actinarctus is a genus of tardigrades in the family Tanarctidae. The genus was named and described by Erich Schulz in 1935.

Species
The genus includes four species:
 Actinarctus doryphorus Schulz, 1935
 Actinarctus lyrophorus Renaud-Mornant, 1979
 Actinarctus neretinus Grimaldi de Zio, D'Addabbo Gallo, Morone De Lucia, Vaccarella & Grimaldi, 1982
 Actinarctus physophorus Grimaldi de Zio, D'Addabbo Gallo, Morone De Lucia, Vaccarella & Grimaldi, 1982

References

Further reading

 Schulz, 1935 : Actinarctus doryphorus nov. gen. nov. spec, ein merkwurdiger Tardigrad aus der Nordsee.'' Zoologischer Anzeiger, vol. 111, p. 285-288.

Tardigrade genera
Arthrotardigrada